Amineh Deh (also Romanized as Amīneh Deh; also known as ‘Almadeh, Almadi, Almady, and Amnīeh Deh) is a village in Gowharan Rural District, in the Central District of Khoy County, West Azerbaijan Province, Iran. At the 2006 census, its population was 234, in 44 families.

References 

Populated places in Khoy County